The presidency of Droupadi Murmu began on 25 July 2022, after she took the oath as the 15th President of India, administered by Chief Justice N. V. Ramana. She was the Bharatiya Janata Party (BJP)-led National Democratic Alliance (NDA) nominee and defeated the United Opposition nominee and former Minister of Finance, Yashwant Sinha. Prior to being the presidential nominee, she was the Governor of Jharkhand and a minister in Odisha Government.

Presidential election of 2022 

In June 2022, the BJP nominated Murmu as the National Democratic Alliance's candidate for President of India for the 2022 election. 

Murmu visited various states as part of the campaign around the country seeking support for her candidature, from BJP lawmakers and other opposition parties. She visited NE states, the JMM party of Jharkhand, BJD of Odisha, Shiv Sena of Maharashta, BSP of Uttar Pradesh, JDS of Karnataka and many others were some of the prominent opposition parties that extended their support to her.

Controversies stirred over when Congress called Murmu a dummy candidate of the BJP through its tweet. RJD's Tejaswi Yadav called her a statue and stated that Rashtrapati Bhavan did not need one. Congress leader Ajoy Kumar said "It's not about Droupadi Murmu. Yashwant Sinha is also a good candidate and Murmu is also a decent person. But she represents a very evil philosophy of India. We should not make her a symbol of 'Adivasi'. We have President Ram Nath Kovind, Hathras happened. Has he said a word? The condition of Scheduled Castes has become worse."

Oaths Administered 
Oaths of Office administered by Murmu

International outreach

Hosted delegation 

A Parliamentary delegation from Mozambique visited the Rashtrapati Bhavan in July 2022, led by the speaker of Assembly of Mozambique. This was the first international delegation visit after her assumption of the office. Murmu also stated that "India and Mozambique enjoy close friendly relations with regular exchange of high-level visits between the two countries."

List of international trips

References 

Presidents of India
Bharatiya Janata Party politicians
Presidencies